Eric (Old Norse: Eiríkr, Swedish: Erik) was a Swedish monarch or local ruler who ruled over Birka, an important port town, and possibly Uppsala, an important early Swedish political center, and is mentioned as dead by 852. His existence is attested by the nearly contemporary account Vita Ansgari, written by the missionary Rimbert, who visited Sweden alongside Ansgar in  852. By the time of their visit, a king by the name Olof ruled, with Eric being deceased since a while (Lat. dudum, which can also mean long ago).

Elevation to divine status 

Eric appears to have been a popular king; according to Rimbert's writings, some of the Anti-Christian Swedes suggested that Eric be worshipped as a god alongside the rest of the Nordic pantheon instead of the new Christian god the missionaries were attempting to introduce in Sweden. As the Vita Ansgari puts it:

Interpretations 

The vagueness of the text as to when Eric actually reigned has led to speculations that he may be identified with any of the kings named Eric who are mentioned in the saga literature. Among the candidates are Erik Björnsson and Erik Refilsson who are however only known from the late Langfeðgatal and Heidreks Saga. There have also been attempts to link him with the ruler Eric who is mentioned on the Sparlösa Runestone from c. 800. The alleged elevation to divine status has been interpreted as an attempt to unite various factions in society through referring to a revered royal ancestral figure. The temple erected in honour of Eric has also been tentatively linked with the much-debated Uppsala temple which is mentioned in an 11th-century source.

See also 
 Christianization of Sweden
 House of Munsö

References 

Swedish monarchs
9th-century Swedish people
9th-century rulers in Europe